Radio RaBe (Berne's cultural radio),  a non-commercial community radio station, is an AMARC and UNIKOM-Radios member station based in Berne/Switzerland. The station is governed as a registered association and is financed through membership dues from more than 1000 members. Radio RaBe broadcasts weekly in some 15-20 languages.

The 30+ music programs cover a wide range of musical styles: reggae, blues, world music, as well as music from nearly all European countries, such as the Balkans or Italy. RaBe provides Bern and the surrounding region with an important community resource of essential information and support for the integration of the foreign community in Berne.

On 17 June 2011 it was announced that Radio RaBe has been awarded the Cultural Prize of Canton Berne 2011.  The prize includes a cash award of 30,000 Swiss Francs.

External links

1996 establishments in Switzerland
Community radio stations
German-language radio stations in Switzerland
Mass media in Bern
Radio stations established in 1996